Joanna Koroniewska (born 27 May 1978 in Toruń, Poland) is a Polish film, television and theater actress, best known for playing in the Polish TV series M jak miłość (L as in, Love).

In 2006 she took part in 3rd season popular TV show Taniec z gwiazdami (Dancing with the Stars). Her dance partner was Robert Kochanek. They took third place. From 3 March to 3 April 2010 together with Łukasz Zagrobelny who was her vocal coach, she participated in the 1st season TV show Tylko nas dwoje (Just The Two Of Us). They took 8th place.

Filmography

Actress 
 2000–2013: M jak miłość (L for Love) as Małgorzata Chodakowska, Mostowiak's daughter
 2003: Zwierzę powierzchni as Magda
 2006: Cold Kenya as Magda
 2008: Niania as herself
 2010:  as Attorney Alicja
 2012: Julia as Patrycja, Janek Janicki's long love
 2012: Hotel 52 as Diana
 2013: Komisarz Alex as star

Dubbing in Polish 
 2005: Herbie: Fully Loaded as Maggie Peyton
 2006: Barnyard as Daisy
 2007: Out of Jimmy's Head as Yancy Roberts 
 2009: Janosik. Prawdziwa historia as Barbara
 2009: Janosik. Prawdziwa historia as Barbara
 2009: Hannah Montana: The Movie as Lorelai
2021: Soul as 22

References

External links 

Official profile in Filmpolski.pl database

1978 births
Polish film actresses
Polish television actresses
People from Toruń
Polish stage actresses
20th-century Polish actresses
Polish voice actresses
Living people